An ellipsis is a punctuation mark comprised a series of dots: ...

"Ellipsis" may also refer to:

Arts
 Ellipsis (narrative device), a literary plot technique whereby events are omitted
 Ellipsis (Biffy Clyro album), a 2016 alt-rock release
 Ellipsis (Scorn album), a 1995 electronica remix

Computing
 Ellipsis (computer programming), a computer language token usually indicating a range of values
 Ellipsis button, a graphical user interface component

Grammar
 Ellipsis (linguistics), the omission from a clause of words otherwise syntactically required by remaining elements
 Verb phrase ellipsis, an elliptical construction in which a verb phrase has been left out (elided)

See also
 Elision (disambiguation)
 Ellipse (disambiguation)
 Ellipses (disambiguation)
 Elliptical (disambiguation)
 "...", a song by Flobots from The Circle in the Square
 The . . . (JYJ album)
 Three dots (disambiguation)